Brandon Turner (born ), also known as Lil B, is an American professional skateboarder.

Career 

Brandon Turner, born , was a youth prodigy skateboarder. Also known as "Lil B", Turner rode with Chad Muska's Shorty's group and came of age during a time of lavish excess for skateboarding, including alcohol and drugs. Following some injuries and time in prison, Turner went through a period of recovery. After turning sober in the late 2010s, he began teaching Pilates, mentoring in addiction recovery programs, and returned to skateboarding in what The New York Times called "an impressive late-career renaissance".

References

Further reading 

 
 
 
 

Living people
1980s births
Year of birth uncertain
African-American skateboarders